Netherlands competed at the 2002 Winter Paralympics in Salt Lake City, United States. The team included 4 athletes, 3 men and 1 women. Competitors from Netherlands won 4 medals, including 1 gold and 3 silver to finish 15th in the medal table.

Medalists

Source: www.paralympic.org & www.olympischstadion.nl

Biathlon

 Arnold Polderman
 Marjorie van de Bunt

Cross-country skiing

 Kjeld Punt
 Martijn Wijsman
 Arnold Polderman
 Marjorie van de Bunt

See also
Netherlands at the Paralympics
Netherlands at the 2002 Winter Olympics

References

External links
International Paralympic Committee official website

Nations at the 2002 Winter Paralympics
2002
Summer Paralympics